Nancee Oku Bright is a Liberian documentary filmmaker, director and producer based in New York City. She is Chief of the humanitarian division of the UN peacekeeping mission in the Democratic Republic of the Congo.

Life
Nancee Oku Bright gained an MA degree and a doctorate in social anthropology from Oxford University. Her PhD, on Eritrean refugees in the Um Gargur refugee camp in Sudan, was published as a book in 1998.

Bright has worked as a journalist, writing for the BBC, several British newspapers, Vogue, Newsday and the Miami Herald. She has made short ethnographic documentaries on refugees in Sudan and life in Liberia. Her PBS documentary Liberia: America's Stepchild (2002) examined the causes of the First Liberian Civil War.

Works

Books
 Mothers of Steel: The Women of Um Gargur, an Eritrean Refugee Settlement in the Sudan, Red Sea Press, 1998

Films
 Liberia: America's Stepchild, 2002

References

External links
 

Year of birth missing (living people)
Living people
Liberian film directors
Documentary film directors
United Nations operations in the Democratic Republic of the Congo
Liberian officials of the United Nations
Women diplomats
Americo-Liberian people
People of Americo-Liberian descent
People of Sierra Leone Creole descent
Liberian journalists